Money is a 1946 Swedish comedy film directed by Nils Poppe.

Plot summary 
Harry Orvar Larsson is a poor tramp who, because of his hopeless existence put the noose around his neck to try to hang himself. But the rope defects and the spark of life returns to him when he meets a more optimistic partner in adversity, the philosopher and tramp, Anton Bodin.

Harry then gets a job as a lumberjack, with the wicked brothers Sint. He meets the young sweet female cook that works for the brothers and they fall in love with each other.

Surprisingly Harry then inherit a lot of money and is forced to escape from the evil brothers, who try to kill him repeatedly to get their hands on his money.

Cast
Nils Poppe as Harry Orvar Larsson, million heir
Sigge Fürst as Sigvard "Sigge" Vildsint, lumberjack
Carl Reinholdz as Kalle Svagsint, lumberjack
Hilding Rolin as Hilding Argsint, lumberjack
Birger Åsander as Birger Ondsint, lumberjack
Gustaf Färingborg as Gustav Småsint, lumberjack
Alexander Baumgarten as Helge Långsint, lumberjack 
Inga Landgré as Maria Bergdahl 
Elof Ahrle as Anton "Filosofen" Bodin, tramp

References

External links

1946 films
1940s Swedish-language films
Swedish black-and-white films
Swedish comedy films
1946 comedy films
1940s Swedish films